Forcemeat (derived from the French farcir, "to stuff") is a uniform mixture of lean meat with fat made by grinding or sieving the ingredients.  The result may either be smooth or coarse. Forcemeats are used in the production of numerous items found in charcuterie, including quenelles, sausages, pâtés, terrines, roulades, and galantines.  Forcemeats are usually produced from raw meat, except in the case of a gratin.  Meats commonly used include pork, fish (pike, trout, or salmon), seafood, game meats (venison, boar, or rabbit), poultry, game birds, veal, and pork livers.  Pork fatback is preferred as a fat, as it has a somewhat neutral flavor.

History
Forcemeats are an ancient food and are included in Apicius, a collection of Roman cookery recipes usually thought to have been compiled in the late 4th or early 5th century AD.

Types
Straight Produced by progressively grinding equal parts pork and pork fat with a third ingredient, a dominant meat, which can be pork or another meat. The portions are cubed and then seasoned, cured, rested, ground and finally placed into the desired vessel.
Country-style A combination of pork and pork fat, often with the addition of pork liver and garnish ingredients. The texture of this finished product is coarse.
Gratin Has a portion of the main protein browned.
Pliante Thin slices of meat pressed together or folded, typically alternating in colour or texture, with fat layered between.
Mousseline Very light in texture, utilizing lean cuts of meat usually from veal, poultry, fish, or shellfish. The resulting texture comes from the addition of eggs and cream to this forcemeat.

Secondary binders
Often, the only binder in a forcemeat is the physical structure of the protein used. Sometimes a secondary binder is necessary to hold the mixture. These binders are generally needed when preparing country-style or gratin forcemeats. The three types of binders are eggs,  dry milk powder, and panades. A panade can be made from starchy ingredients which aid in the binding process; these include well-cooked potatoes which have been puréed, cream-soaked bread, or pâte à choux.

See also
Ground beef
Minced meat
Pemmican
Tourtière
Pâté

Notes

References 
The Culinary Institute of America. Garde Manger: The Art and Craft of the Cold Kitchen. 3rd ed. Hoboken, NJ: John Wiley & Sons, 2008. .

Ancient dishes
Culinary terminology
Garde manger
Meat

es:Farsa (cocina)
ru:Фарш
sv:Köttfärs